Pine Creek is a tributary of Mill Creek, which, in turn, is a tributary of the Neshaminy Creek, 
part of the Delaware River watershed.

Statistics
Rising in Northampton Township, Pine Run flows in a southerly direction for about one-third its length before turning easterly, the finally southerly again to its confluence with Mill Creek at its 0.15 river mile.

Pennsylvania Department of Environmental Protection designation is 02520.
US Geological Survey designation is 1183875.

Geology
Appalachian Highlands Division
Piedmont Province
Gettysburg-Newark Lowland Section
Stockton Formation
Pine Run lies within the Stockton Formation, a sedimentary layer of rock laid down during the Triassic. Mineralogy includes sandstone, arkosic sandstone, shale, siltstone, and mudstone.

Municipalities
Pine Run lies completely within Northampton Township.

Crossings and bridges

See also
List of rivers of Pennsylvania
List of rivers of the United States
List of Delaware River tributaries

References

Rivers of Pennsylvania
Rivers of Bucks County, Pennsylvania
Tributaries of the Neshaminy Creek